Elmapınar may refer to:

 Elmapınar, Çat
 Elmapınar, Kalecik
 Elmapınar, Mecitözü
 Elmapınar, Mut